Auaké may refer to:
 Auaké people, an ethnic group of the Amazon
 Auaké language, their language

Language and nationality disambiguation pages